New Democratic Force is a political party of the Albanian minority in Montenegro.

The party was founded on 22 October 2005 as a local minority party representing the Albanian population in Ulcinj. Nazif Cungu was elected as its president at the founding assembly. In April 2008, FORCA opened a branch of its party in Tuzi.
On the 4-th Congress of the party held on October 30th, 2021, Genci Nimanbegu was elected as the new leader of the party.

Electoral performance 
On last parliamentary elections, on 29 March 2009, Forca has one seat, becoming for the first time a parliamentary party.

In the run-up to the 2008 presidential election, it supported the opposition candidate, Nebojša Medojević.

In the Municipal Parliament of Ulcinj, FORCA has 11 out of 33 seats. 

In September 2016, FORCA agreed to form a pre-election alliance with Albanian Alternative (AA) and Democratic Union of Albanians (DUA) for 2016 elections. The coalition won one seat in the election, which was allocated to a member of FORCA. 

Prior of the 2020 elections, FORCA continuing close cooperation with the right-wing Albanian Alternative, forming a new coalition under the name Albanian List, coalition was also joined by other minor Albanian parties and movements.

Parliamentary elections

References

External links
Official website

2005 establishments in Serbia and Montenegro
Albanian political parties in Montenegro
Conservative parties in Montenegro
Political parties established in 2005
Pro-European political parties in Montenegro